Shiv Shastri Balboa is a 2023 Indian Hindi Comedy drama film written and  directed by Ajayan Venugopalan. The film stars Anupam Kher, Neena Gupta and Jugal Hansraj in lead roles. The film was shot mostly in New Jersey, U.S. The soundtrack and background score were composed by Alokananda Dasgupta. The cinematography was done by Joshua Ausley and edited by Praveen Prabhakar.

Plot 
Shiv Shastri a retiree, a widower from India, and a big  Rocky movie fan move to the USA to be with his only son. Stuck in a large house alone with a dog, he is forced to befriend him and makes an unlikely bond with an undocumented housekeeper named Elsa. Though they belong to different economic and social strata, these two lonely souls end up on an unexpected road trip through the American heartland which teaches that it's never too old to reinvent yourself.

Shiv Shastri Balboa is a comedy that discusses cultural stigma, undocumented immigration, and racism and how a man's passion for cinema can overcome it all.

Cast
Anupam Kher as Shiv Shastri
Neena Gupta as Elsa
Jugal Hansraj as Rahul
Sharib Hashmi as Sinmohan Singh
Nargis Fakhri as Siya
Aarav Desai as Advaith
Rajat Sharma as himself

Critical reception and reviews 
Dhaval Roy of The Times of India gave 4 out of 5 ratings  Joyeeta Mitra Suvarna of India TV gave 4 out of 5 ratings, Urmila Kori of Prabhat Khabar gave 3 out of 5 ratings, Virendra Mishra of Amar Ujala gave 3 out of 5 ratings, and Roktim Rajpal of India Today gave 2.5 out of 5 ratings.

Monika Rawal Kukreja of Hindustan Times wrote "Shiv Shastri Balboa is sweet, innocent and an endearing story about love, life and learnings.", Rekha Khan of Navbharat Times wrote "Lovers of family and entertainment films can watch this film.",.

The film has been also reviewed by Jyotsna Rawat of Navodaya Times, Manoj Vashist of Dainik Jagran,.

Screenings and film festivals

The film premiered in North America at Chicago South Asian film festival and Atlanta Indian Film Festival and received rave reviews.

Shiv Shastri Balboa was awarded the best feature film (Runner-up) at CSAFF.

References 

2020s Hindi-language films
Films shot in New Jersey